Simon Jonathan Legg (born 24 June 1966) is a former English cricketer. Legg was a right-handed batsman who played primarily as a wicketkeeper.

Legg made his debut for Dorset in the 1989 Minor Counties Championship against Buckinghamshire. He represented Dorset in 8 Minor Counties Championship matches from 1989 to 1994, with his final Minor Counties match for Dorset coming against Shropshire.

In 1989, he made his only List-A appearance for Dorset against Kent in the 1st round of the 1989 NatWest Trophy. Legg scored what would be his only List-A half century with a score of 66.

External links
Simon Legg at Cricinfo
Simon Legg at CricketArchive

1966 births
Living people
People from Yeovil
English cricketers
Dorset cricketers
Wicket-keepers